Yoshii (written: 吉井) is a Japanese surname. Notable people with the surname include:

, Japanese politician
, Japanese poet and playwright
, Japanese idol, singer and actress
, Japanese musician
, Japanese footballer
, Japanese baseball player
, Japanese footballer
, Japanese actress
, Japanese speed skater

Japanese-language surnames